Fiorentino Sullo (1921–2000) was an Italian politician who was a member of the Christian Democracy. He held several cabinet posts, including minister public works.

Early life and education
Sullo was born in Paternopoli on 29 March 1921. He graduated from the faculty of literature and philosophy at the University of Naples. Then he received a degree in law from the University of Naples in March 1949.

Career and activities
Following his graduation Sullo worked as a history and philosophy teacher in high schools from 1944 to 1946. He became a member of Christian Democracy in April 1944. In 1946 he was elected to the Constituent Assembly from the Salerno-Avellino district. He represent the party at the Parliament for eight terms between 1948 and 1987 with one-term interruption from1976 to 1979. Sullo was named as the national leader of a leftist faction (Italian: Sinistra di Base) in the party. He left the faction in 1964 and joined another one, the Dorotei (Dorotheans) faction.

Sullo served as state secretary in three successive cabinet between 1957 and 1960. He was appointed minister of transport on 25 March 1960 to the cabinet of Fernando Tambroni. Sullo resigned from the post on 11 April 1960. Next Sullo was named as the minister of labor and social security on 26 July 1960 to the cabinet led by Amintore Fanfani and served in the post until 20 February 1962. Sullo was the minister of public works between 21 February 1962 and 20 June 1963 in the next cabinet led by Amintore Fanfani. From June to December 1963 he continued to serve in the same post in the subsequent cabinet headed by Giovanni Leone. In April 1968 he was again nominated as minister of public works, but he was not confirmed by the Parliament. Therefore, his reformation plan which had been initiated by him in 1962 ended.

In December 1968 Sullo was appointed minister of education in the cabinet of Mariano Rumor. Sullo resigned from office in February 1969. From February 1972 to July 1973 he served in the first and second cabinets of Giulio Andreotti as state minister without portfolio. In March 1974 Sullo resigned from the Christian Democracy and joined the Italian Social Democratic Party in June that year. However, he was elected to the Parliament in 1983 on the list of the Christian Democracy where he served until 1987.

Personal life and death
In 1961 Sullo married Viretta De Laurentiis with whom he would have a daughter, Marcella. Following his retirement from politics they settled in Torella dei Lombardi in the province of Avellino. He died of complications resulted from diabetes in Salerno on 3 July 2000.

Legacy
Following his death a foundation was established with his name, Fiorentino Sullo Foundation.

References

External links

20th-century Italian lawyers
1921 births
2000 deaths
Christian Democracy (Italy) politicians
Italian Ministers of Public Works
Transport ministers of Italy
University of Naples Federico II alumni
Italian Democratic Socialist Party politicians
Education ministers of Italy
People from the Province of Avellino
Deaths from diabetes
Deputies of Legislature I of Italy
Deputies of Legislature II of Italy
Deputies of Legislature III of Italy
Deputies of Legislature IV of Italy
Deputies of Legislature V of Italy
Deputies of Legislature VI of Italy
Deputies of Legislature VIII of Italy
Deputies of Legislature IX of Italy
Italian Ministers of Labour
Members of the Constituent Assembly of Italy